The scaly-breasted cupwing or scaly-breasted wren-babbler (Pnoepyga albiventer) is a species of bird in the Pnoepyga wren-babblers family, Pnoepygidae. It is found in southern and eastern Asia from the Himalayas to Indochina.

Taxonomy and systematics
The Taiwan cupwing was once treated as a subspecies of the scaly-breasted cupwing. The Chinese cupwing has been merged into this species.

Description
The scaly-breasted cupwing is a very small babbler with almost no tail, around 9 cm long and weighing between 19 and 23 g. The plumage is olive on the back and lightly scalloped on the chest.

Distribution and habitat
The natural habitat of the scaly-breasted cupwing is subtropical moist montane forest. Within that habitat it is usually found near water. The species undertakes some altitudinal migration, moving closer to sea level during the winter over some of its range.

Gallery

References

Collar, N. J. & Robson, C. 2007. Family Timaliidae (Babblers)  pp. 70 – 291 in; del Hoyo, J., Elliott, A. & Christie, D.A. eds. Handbook of the Birds of the World, Vol. 12. Picathartes to Tits and Chickadees. Lynx Edicions, Barcelona.

scaly-breasted cupwing
Birds of North India
Birds of Nepal
Birds of Eastern Himalaya
Birds of Central China
Birds of Yunnan
Birds of Vietnam
scaly-breasted cupwing
Taxonomy articles created by Polbot